Savira Sullu (Kannada: ಸಾವಿರ ಸುಳ್ಳು; English: Thousand Lies) is a 1985 Indian Kannada film, directed by B. Subba Rao and produced by N. Veeraswamy. The film stars V. Ravichandran, Radha (in her first Kannada significant role), C. R. Simha, *Lokesh and Manjula in the lead roles. The film has musical score by Shankar–Ganesh. The movie was a remake of the 1982 Tamil movie Manal Kayiru.

Cast

V. Ravichandran as Muddukrishna
Radha as herself 
C. R. Simha as Puttappa
Manjula
Lokesh as Na.Ra.da.Naidu
B. R. Prasanna Kumar
Sundar Raj
Balakrishna
Leelavathi

Soundtrack 
"Aakasha Neenadare" - S. Janaki, S. P. Balasubrahmanyam
"Hennendarenu" - S. Janaki, S. P. Balasubrahmanyam
"Intha Ganda Node Illa" - S. Janaki, S. P. Balasubrahmanyam
"Kannere Ingithe" - S. P. Balasubrahmanyam

References

External links
 

1985 films
1980s Kannada-language films
Films scored by Shankar–Ganesh
Kannada remakes of Tamil films
Indian comedy films
1985 comedy films